Tajikistan competed at the 2016 Asian Beach Games held in Danang, Vietnam from 24 September to 3 October 2016

Competitors

2016 in Tajikistani sport
Nations at the 2016 Asian Beach Games
Tajikistan at the Asian Beach Games